Prince Karl Theodor Maximilian August of Bavaria (7 July 1795 – 16 August 1875);  and grand prior of the order of Malta, was a German soldier.

Early life 
Charles was born in Munich on 7 July 1795. He was the second son of King Maximilian I of Bavaria and his first wife Princess Augusta Wilhelmine of Hesse-Darmstadt.

Career 
Charles fought against Napoleon at the Battle of Hanau in 1813, became a general of division, and took part in the Campaign of 1814. His differences with Prince Wrede led to his retirement from 1822 till some time after the latter's death in 1838, when his brother King Ludwig I of Bavaria appointed him field marshal and general inspector of the army. In the Austro-Prussian War of 1866, he was commander-in-chief of the 7th and 8th corps of the Bavarian Army, being allied with Austria. His troops, some 52,000 men, served in the Main Campaign. Afterwards he retired from public service.

Personal life 
He married, morganatically, on 1 October 1823 with Marie-Anne-Sophie Petin (27 July 1796, Neuburg – 22 February 1838, Munich), who was created Baroness von Bayrstorff upon their marriage. She was a daughter of Franz Moritz Petin and Baroness Maria Theodora von Branca. Before her death at Tegernsee in 1838, they were the parents of three daughters:

 Caroline Sophie von Bayrstorff (17 October 1816 – 25 May 1889), who married Adolf, Baron von Gumppenberg (1804–1877) in 1834.
 Maximiliane Theodore von Bayrstorff (30 September 1823 – 19 March 1885), who married August, Count von Drechsel zu Deufstetten (1810–1880), in 1841.
 Franziska Sophie von Bayrstorff (10 October 1827 – 2 March 1912), who married Portuguese-Brazilian nobleman Paulo Martins, Viscount d'Almeida (1807–1874) in 1845.

Prince Karl fell from his horse while riding at Tegernsee in Bavaria on 16 August 1875 and was killed instantly.

Descendants 
Through his eldest daughter, he was a grandfather of Maximiliane, Baroness von Gumppenberg (1850–1937), who married Count Maximilian von Holnstein, a close friend of King Ludwig II who brought Ludwig's "Kaiserbrief" to Otto von Bismarck.

Honours

Ancestry

Notes

References 
 

Attribution:

Further reading 

1795 births
1875 deaths
House of Wittelsbach
Members of the Bavarian Reichsrat
Princes of Bavaria
German military personnel of the Napoleonic Wars
Field marshals of Bavaria
Knights of the Military Order of Max Joseph
Grand Crosses of the Military Merit Order (Bavaria)
Grand Crosses of the Order of Saint Stephen of Hungary
Knights of the Golden Fleece of Austria
Knights Cross of the Military Order of Maria Theresa
Recipients of the Order of St. George of the Fourth Degree
Recipients of the Order of the White Eagle (Russia)
Recipients of the Order of St. Anna, 1st class
Recipients of the Order of the Netherlands Lion
Knights of the Order of Saint Joseph
Sons of kings